Georges Blanc may refer to:
 Georges Blanc (pilot) (1887–1960), French First World War flying ace
 Georges Blanc (chef) (born 1943), French head chef and owner of restaurant George Blanc